Nobody Knows My Name: More Notes of a Native Son is a collection of essays, published by Dial Press in July 1961, by American author James Baldwin. Like Baldwin's first collection, Notes of a Native Son (publ. 1955), it includes revised versions of several of his previously published essays, as well as new material.

Essays

Critical reception
In The New York Times, Irving Howe called it a "brilliant new collection of essays." He adds, "To take a cue from his title, we had better learn his name."

References

1961 non-fiction books
Essay collections by James Baldwin
1960s essays